Dokuro is a video game developed by Game Arts and published by GungHo Online Entertainment originally for the PlayStation Vita with later ports to iOS, Android, Microsoft Windows and Nintendo Switch. The player controls Dokuro, who must save a princess after the Dark Lord wants to marry her.

Gameplay
The player is Dokuro, a skeletal worker for the Dark Lord. One day, the Dark Lord captures a princess and forces her to marry him. Dokuro sees the princess crying which breaks his heart and he thus decides to help her escape the Dark Lord's castle. Dokuro can flip switches to open up paths, carry the princess after drinking a potion, as well as others. The game's levels grow steadily more complex as the game progresses.

Development
The game uses a graphical style that imitates artwork in a children's storybook. The game's director, Noriaki Kazama, previously worked on gory video games such as Ninja Gaiden Sigma under Team Ninja. Kazama said that after he had a baby, he browsed through children's books at the bookstore and was inspired by the art style.

Reception

IGN gave the game an 8.8, saying "Stunningly beautiful and exceptionally fun to play, Dokuro belongs in the library of every PlayStation Vita owner." Joystiq claimed that "Despite the bony exterior, Dokuro feels like it has a real soul, like it was made by people who truly loved and believed in it. It's inspired, well-made, and thoroughly enchanting", giving the game a 4 out of 5. Game Informer, however, gave the game a negative review, stating "Between its unforgiving nature, unbalanced difficulty, and humdrum puzzles, I wouldn't have pressed on through Dokuro if I wasn't reviewing it. Rarely did I feel that fun "a-ha" moment that makes puzzle games exciting; instead I found tedium and frustration. I surely wasn't as devoted to this game as Dokuro was to the princess."

References

External links
Official site

2012 video games
Art games
Game Arts games
PlayStation Vita games
Puzzle video games
Android (operating system) games
IOS games
Video games about skeletons
Video games developed in Japan
Video games set in castles
Windows games